Lee Fang (born October 31, 1986) is an American journalist. He is currently an investigative reporter at The Intercept. Previously, he was a reporting fellow at The Nation Institute and a contributing writer at The Nation. Fang was also a writer at progressive outlet the Republic Report. He began his career as an investigative blogger for ThinkProgress. In 2018, the Izzy Award of the Park Center for Independent Media was awarded to Fang and fellow Intercept reporter  Sharon Lerner, and was also shared by investigative reporter  Dahr Jamail, and author Todd Miller.

Early life and career
Fang's hometown is in Prince George's County, Maryland. He attended the University of Maryland, College Park, graduating with a B.A. in government and politics in 2009. In college, Fang served as President of the Federation of Maryland College Democrats, editor of the Maryland College Democrat blog, and on the Campus Progress Advisory Board. Fang interned with ThinkProgress and served as a researcher for Progressive Accountability. As an undergraduate, Fang also interned for Congresswoman Stephanie Tubbs Jones (D-OH), Congressman Steny Hoyer (D-MD), for progressive media watchdog group Media Matters for America, and for the lobbying firm Westin Rinehart.

ThinkProgress
In 2011, Fang published several articles where he alleged that special interests manipulated the media reaction to the Occupy Wall Street protests.

United States Chamber of Commerce article
An article posted on ThinkProgress on October 5, 2010, authored by Fang, attracted attention and controversy. Fang wrote a story in which he alleged that the United States Chamber of Commerce funded political attack campaigns from its general fund, which solicits funds from foreign sources. Fang stated that the Chamber was "likely skirting longstanding campaign finance law that bans the involvement of foreign corporations in American elections."

The story was repeated by The Huffington Post and the progressive activist group MoveOn.org asked the Department of Justice to launch a criminal investigation of the Chamber's funding.

The fact-checking website FactCheck.org analyzed the claim that "foreign corporations are 'stealing our democracy' with secret, illegal contributions funneled through the U.S. Chamber of Commerce," noting that ThinkProgress made the initial allegations. FactCheck concluded that "It’s a claim with little basis in fact." Eric Lichtblau of The New York Times wrote that the article "provided no evidence that the money generated overseas had been used in United States campaigns."

Reporting on Koch Industries
In April 2011, Fang wrote an article titled "The Contango Game: How Koch Industries Manipulates The Oil Market For Profit," in which he said "Koch Industries occupies a unique role in manipulating the oil market." The story was picked up by CBS.

Fang had previously written about Charles and David Koch, and he was involved with a Robert Greenwald documentary titled Koch Brothers Exposed. In March 2011, he reported that New Media Strategies, a firm employed by the Kochs, had been caught manipulating Wikipedia content and were banned from the website for sockpuppetry. Politico wrote that "Fang’s relentless chronicling of the Koch brothers have made him something of a star on the left."

The Intercept
Fang started working with The Intercept as an investigative reporter in February 2015.

In June 2020, Fang was accused of racism by Akela Lacy, a colleague at The Intercept. This occurred after Fang shared a Martin Luther King Jr. quote about remaining non-violent and tweeted out an interview in which a black man at a George Floyd protest expressed concern about black-on-black crime. Fang's tweets set off a "firestorm" on Twitter and he issued a lengthy apology.

Twitter Files 
In December 2022, Fang reported in The Intercept that Twitter "provided direct approval and internal protection to the U.S. military’s network of social media accounts and online personas." The Department of Defense utilized a network of Twitter accounts to shape opinion on American interventions in the Middle East as part of a "government-backed covert propaganda campaign." Many of the accounts operated without disclosure of their US government affiliation. The piece was a part of a broader journalistic effort by Matt Taibbi called the Twitter Files, initiated after Elon Musk's purchase of the platform, an investigation into Twitter's content moderation practices and their effect on American political events.

Political views
Fang has been described as a "liberal" by The New York Times, and as both "liberal" and "progressive" by Salon. Liberal commentator Jonathan Chait described Fang as "left-wing" and wrote "Like many Bernie Sanders supporters, Fang often lacerates mainstream liberals both for insufficient populist zeal and, on occasion, for excessive focus on identity at the expense of class. His views on economics put him well to the left of the Democratic Party, while his views on race and gender would sit comfortably in the middle of it, and often put him at odds with fellow leftists."

According to Fang, "I like hanging out with fully grassroots Tea Party activists because, for the most part, whatever their motivations are, they're just upset about society and they want to do something about it which, at the core, I respect even though I pretty much disagree with their worldview."

Personal life

His brother, Daniel, is the drummer for the band Turnstile.

Bibliography

References

External links
Articles by Fang at The Nation
Lee Fang at The Intercept

1986 births
Living people
American political journalists
People from Prince George's County, Maryland
University of Maryland, College Park alumni
The Nation (U.S. magazine) people
American people of Chinese descent